St. Helen is an unincorporated community and census-designated place (CDP) in Roscommon County in the U.S. state of Michigan.  The population was 2,735 at the 2020 census.  St. Helen is located within Richfield Township.

History
In the 1870s, lumber baron Henry Stephens established a large lumber operation at St. Helen, considered at the time to be among the largest and best equipped in the state. The mills were estimated to have produced more than 1 billion board feet (2,000,000 m3) of lumber within a period of fourteen years.  Most of the logs were moved by river, but lumber was also moved by rail.

St. Helen was named after the lake.  It is believed that French voyageurs named it after Saint Helena of Constantinople, mother of Emperor Constantine.

The Detroit, Bay City and Alpena Railroad (later the Michigan Central, then the Detroit and Mackinac Railway and presently the Lake State Railway Company) built a line through the area with a station at St. Helen.  M-76 passes through St. Helen and portions are still signed as "Old 76".

Geography

Demographics

As of the census of 2000, there were 2,993 people, 1,380 households, and 873 families residing in the community.  The population density was 229.3/km (593.6/mi).  There were 2,617 housing units at an average density of 200.5/km (519.1/mi).  The racial makeup of the community was 98.46% White, 0.07% African American, 0.63% Native American, 0.10% Asian, 0.03% Pacific Islander, 0.07% from other races, and 0.63% from two or more races.  0.77% of the population were Hispanic or Latino of any race.

There were 1,380 households, out of which 20.7% had children under the age of 18 living with them, 49.3% were married couples living together, 10.4% had a female householder with no husband present, and 36.7% were non-families. 32.3% of all households were made up of individuals, and 17.0% had someone living alone who was 65 years of age or older.  The average household size was 2.17 and the average family size was 2.67.

In the community the population was spread out, with 20.3% under the age of 18, 4.3% from 18 to 24, 22.9% from 25 to 44, 27.2% from 45 to 64, and 25.3% who were 65 years of age or older.  The median age was 48 years.  For every 100 females there were 94.6 males.  For every 100 females age 18 and over, there were 88.8 males.

The median income for a household in the community was $24,104, and the median income for a family was $30,268. Males had a median income of $30,521 versus $20,461 for females. The per capita income for the community was $17,198.  19.5% of the population and 12.8% of families were below the poverty line.  Out of the total people living in poverty, 32.6% were under the age of 18 and 9.1% were 65 or older.

Notable people
Charlton Heston spent part of his childhood in St. Helen.  The Charlton Heston Academy in St. Helen is named after him.

Further reading
Diss, Peggy. The Heritage of Richfield Township, St. Helen. Roscommon, MI: Graphic Arts Press, 1976.

References

External links
St. Helen Chamber of Commerce

Unincorporated communities in Roscommon County, Michigan
Census-designated places in Michigan
Unincorporated communities in Michigan
Census-designated places in Roscommon County, Michigan